Marisa Isabel Baena (born 1 June 1977) is a Colombian golfer who plays on the U.S.-based LPGA Tour.

Baena was born in Pereira, Colombia. She started playing golf at the age of six. She attended the University of Arizona in the United States and had an outstanding amateur career, the highlights of which were claiming the individual NCAA title in 1996 and finishing at runner up at the U.S. Women's Amateur in the same year. In 1996, she won the Honda Award (now the Honda Sports Award) as the best female collegiate golfer in the nation.

She qualified for the LPGA Tour at her first attempt and had her rookie season in 1999, but she has not so far fully lived up to the promise of her amateur days. Her best finish in a stroke play tournament on the Tour is a tie for second place at the 2003 Jamie Farr Kroger Classic. In July 2005 she was the surprise winner of the first HSBC Women's World Match Play Championship, beating South Korea's Meena Lee by one hole in the final. She won $500,000, a three-year exemption on the LPGA Tour, and a gold horseshoe necklace.

She represented Team International in the inaugural Lexus Cup competition in 2005. She and her sister Christina represented Colombia in the 2006 Women's World Cup of Golf.

Professional wins (1)

LPGA Tour wins (1)

Results in LPGA majors

^ The Women's British Open replaced the du Maurier Classic as an LPGA major in 2001.

LA = Low amateur
CUT = missed the half-way cut
"T" = tied

Team appearances
Professional
 Lexus Cup (representing International team): 2005 (winners)
 World Cup (representing Colombia): 2006

References

External links

Profile on the Colombian Golf Federation's official site

Colombian female golfers
Arizona Wildcats women's golfers
LPGA Tour golfers
People from Pereira, Colombia
1977 births
Living people